Heavy Love is the fourth studio album by English singer Louise. It was released on 17 January 2020 by Lil Lou Records under partnership with Warner. The album was preceded by the single "Stretch", released on 26 March 2019. The album includes contributions from Clean Bandit, Eg White, Raye, Karen Poole and Sinéad Harnett. "Lead Me On" was released on 4 July 2019 as the album's second single, receiving its premiere on BBC Radio 2. "Not the Same" was released as the third single alongside a lyric video. The track reached BBC Radio 2's C-List. "Hurt" was released as the fourth single with a 'Single Version', with the track being added BBC Radio 2's A-List.

On 4 September 2019, it was announced that the album would be postponed from 18 October 2019 to 17 January 2020, with Louise citing the promotional schedule for 9 to 5: The Musical as the reason for the delayed release.

The album debuted at number 11 on the UK Albums Chart on the issue dated 24 January 2020.

Track listing

Charts

Heavy Love Tour
Dates:

The Heavy Love Tour began in Southampton on 12 March 2020, visiting the following venues:
 12 March 2020: 1865, Southampton
 14 March 2020: Tramshed, Cardiff
 15 March 2020: SWX, Bristol
 16 March 2020: O2 Institute, Birmingham

Postponed dates

The following dates were announced as indefinitely postponed on 17 March 2020 due to the COVID-19 pandemic:
 18 March 2020: Rock City, Nottingham
 19 March 2020: O2 Ritz, Manchester
 21 March 2020: Beckett Student Union, Leeds
 22 March 2020: SWG3, Glasgow
 24 March 2020: Boiler Shop, Newcastle
 25 March 2020: Cambridge Junction, Cambridge
 26 March 2020: Shepherd's Bush Empire, London

Setlist

The setlist on 12 March:
 "Hammer"
 "In Walked Love" (new mix by Steve Anderson)
 "Stretch" (Initial Talk Remix)
 "2 Faced"
 "Stay" (Eternal song), including an interpolation of "Sweet Love" by Anita Baker
 "Villain"
 "Escapade" (Janet Jackson cover)
 "Lead Me On"
 "Stuck in the Middle with You"
 "Straight to My Heart"
 "Naked" (new mix by Steve Anderson)
 "Settle for Nothing"
 "So Good (Eternal song)
 "Oh Baby I..." (Eternal song)
 "Just a Step from Heaven" (Eternal song)
 "Light of My Life" (Piano and Vocal Mix)
 "Not the Same"
 "Arms Around the World" (new mix by Steve Anderson)
Encore:
 "Wrong"
 "Hurt"
 "The Boss" (Diana Ross cover)
 "Let's Go Round Again", including an interpolation of "One More Time" by Daft Punk

References

2020 albums
Louise Redknapp albums
Warner Records albums